Reinig is a surname. Notable people with the surname include:

 Christa Reinig (1926–2008), German poet, fiction, and non-fiction writer and dramatist
 Gaston Reinig (born 1956), Luxembourgian soldier

Surnames of German origin